Chinchey, also known as Rurichinchay, is a   mountain in the Cordillera Blanca in the Andes of Peru. It is located in the region of Ancash, most precisely between the districts of Aco (in Carhuaz Province), Independencia (in Huaraz Province), and Huari (in Huari Province).

It flows to the southeast.

See also 
 Pucaranra

References

Mountains of Peru
Mountains of Ancash Region
Glaciers of Peru
Lakes of Peru
Lakes of Ancash Region
Rivers of Peru
Rivers of Ancash Region
Six-thousanders of the Andes